The Best of... So Far is a greatest hits album by British rock band The Kooks, released on 19 May 2017 by Virgin and Astralwerks. The compilation includes singles from the band's four studio albums to date, non-singles "Seaside" and "Matchbox" from debut album Inside In/Inside Out, and two new tracks, "Be Who You Are" and "Broken Vow". The deluxe edition of the album includes a 20-track second disc containing demos and alternate versions.

Background
On 21 November 2016, The Kooks announced a 'Best Of' UK Tour to take place in April and May 2017 to mark their tenth anniversary as a band, in which they were planning to perform hits, b-sides and brand new music. To coincide with the tour, on 31 March 2017 the band announced the upcoming release of The Best of... So Far, as well as releasing "Be Who You Are", one of two new songs included on the compilation.

Lead singer and songwriter Luke Pritchard cited initial hesitation in releasing a greatest hits compilation. He stated, "I wasn't particularly sure about the idea of doing a 'best of' album to begin with, because we're not even old - we haven't even been around for twenty years, but it's been cool to see the nostalgia out there from people who grew up with our music." Regarding the compilation's song selection, Pritchard added, "We chose the songs that we thought defined us the most over the years and put them on there."

The two new songs included in the compilation were recorded during sessions with producer Brandon Friesen for the band's upcoming fifth album, Let's Go Sunshine. According to Pritchard, "Be Who You Are" was an attempt to recreate the band's old sound. He said, "I was like, 'What would I have written then, and what kind of style should it be?' The lyrics are all self-reflective and about me at that time. I thought it would be good to go with all the other songs, so it's a nice reflective moment."

Meanwhile, "Broken Vow" is a tale that was inspired by the "hypocrisy" of the Catholic Church, of which Pritchard had some first-hand experience having gone to an all-boys Catholic school in his youth.

Pritchard was also keen to emphasize that this compilation did not signal the end of the band. "It's been the greatest pleasure to work, travel, fight, hate and love the best and most talented people I've met in my life. It's the greatest job in the world and we don't intend to stop any time soon."

Track listing

Personnel
Luke Pritchard – vocals, guitar
Hugh Harris – guitar (except tracks 4, 8 and 12), backing vocals
Peter Denton – bass (tracks 3, 4, 8, 10, 17 and 18), guitar (track 4), backing vocals
Alexis Nuñez – drums (tracks 4, 8, 12, 17 and 18), bass (track 12)
Max Rafferty – bass (except tracks 3, 4, 8, 10, 12, 17 and 18), backing vocals
Paul Garred – drums (except tracks 4, 8, 12, 17 and 18)

Charts

Certifications

References

2017 greatest hits albums
The Kooks albums
Virgin EMI Records albums